Smallpdf is a Swiss online web-based PDF software, founded in 2013. It offers free services to compress, convert and edit PDF documents.

History 

Smallpdf was founded in 2013 by Mathis Büchi, Lino Teuterberg, and Manuel Stofer while they were living abroad in Korea. The idea came from the need for their families to compress and send large documents via email.

The initial version of the site featured a standalone PDF compression tool. Since then, the online platform has introduced over 16 PDF tools to convert, compress and edit PDF documents. As of 2019, approximately 25 million unique users use Smallpdf every month.

In November 2018, it was announced that Smallpdf would integrate with Dropbox as part of the 'Dropbox Extensions', to provide Dropbox users with PDF editing capabilities.

Technical partners

Smallpdf partners with Solid Documents for PDF to Office libraries, as well as with PDF tools. Solid Documents is a New Zealand-based company offering desktop PDF solutions.

See also 

 List of PDF software

References 

Swiss companies established in 2013
Software companies of Switzerland
Software companies established in 2013
Companies based in Zürich
Swiss websites
Internet properties established in 2013
PDF software